The 25th Golden Horse Awards (Mandarin:第25屆金馬獎) took place on November 5, 1988, at Chung Hwa Sports Stadium in Taipei, Taiwan.

References

25th
1988 film awards
1988 in Taiwan